Guinea participated at the 2018 Summer Youth Olympics in Buenos Aires, Argentina from 6 October to 18 October 2018.

Athletics

Judo

Swimming

References

Oly
Nations at the 2018 Summer Youth Olympics
Guinea at the Youth Olympics